The year 1965 was the 184th year of the Rattanakosin Kingdom of Thailand. It was the 20th year in the reign of King Bhumibol Adulyadej (Rama IX), and is reckoned as year 2508 in the Buddhist Era.

Incumbents
King: Bhumibol Adulyadej 
Crown Prince: (vacant)
Prime Minister: Thanom Kittikachorn
Supreme Patriarch: 
until 15 May: Ariyavongsagatanana IV
starting 25 November: Ariyavongsagatanana V

Events

July
24 July - Miss Thailand Apasra Hongsakula won the crown title of the Miss Universe 1965 held in Miami Beach, Florida, United States.

References 

 
Years of the 20th century in Thailand
Thailand
Thailand
1960s in Thailand